The Iraqi football champions are the winners of the highest league in Iraqi football. Following the establishment of the Iraq Football Association (IFA) in 1948, a regional league called the Iraq Central FA League was held for teams from Baghdad and its neighbouring cities, alongside three other regional leagues in Basra, Kirkuk and Mosul. These league championships lasted until 1973, when the IFA established the first nationwide football league in Iraq by the name of Iraqi National First Division, which featured a mixture of clubs and institute teams.

After one season, a new clubs-only league competition was established, with many of the institute teams merging together or being replaced by sports clubs. The first season saw Al-Tayaran (now known as Al-Quwa Al-Jawiya) achieving the league title. The four "Popular Teams" of Baghdad (Al-Zawraa, Al-Quwa Al-Jawiya, Al-Shorta and Al-Talaba), have dominated the now-called Iraqi Premier League over the years. Al-Quwa Al-Jawiya and Al-Shorta have appeared in every season of the top-flight, while Al-Zawraa and Al-Talaba have also never been relegated.

Al-Zawraa have won 14 titles, the most of any club. Erbil are the only club outside of Baghdad to achieve more than one title, having won four titles, all in the 21st century.

List of champions

1973–1974: Iraqi National First Division

1974–present: Iraqi Premier League

Total titles won
There are 11 clubs who have won the Iraqi title.

Teams in bold compete in the Premier League as of the 2022–23 season.

By region

By city

See also
 For Iraqi women's football champions, see Iraqi Women's Football League: List of champions
 Iraq Central FA League
 Iraq FA Basra League
 Iraq FA Kirkuk League
 Iraqi National First Division
 Iraqi Premier League

Notes

References

External links
 Iraq Football Association

 

Football in Iraq
Champions
Iraq